Nicole "Nikki" Jai Budzinski (born March 11, 1977) is an American politician and labor union leader. She has served as the U.S. representative for Illinois's 13th congressional district since 2023, as a member of the Democratic Party.

In 2021, Budzinski served as chief of staff to the director of the Office of Management and Budget (OMB) in the Biden administration.

Early life and education 
Budzinski was born in Peoria, Illinois. Her grandparents were both union members: Leonard Budzinski, her grandfather, as a painter employed by the Peoria School District, and her grandmother as a teacher in the same district.

Budzinski graduated from the University of Illinois Urbana-Champaign and interned for U.S. Representative Dick Gephardt, U.S. Senator Paul Simon, and Planned Parenthood. After college, she worked for the United Food and Commercial Workers union as national political director in Washington, D.C.

Early career 
During the 2018 Illinois gubernatorial election, Budzinski led J. B. Pritzker's exploratory committee and was later a senior advisor to his campaign, focusing on political strategy, messaging and outreach. After Pritzker won, she was named transition director.

When Pritzker became governor on January 14, 2019, Budzinski was appointed senior advisor. She simultaneously chaired the Broadband Advisory Council (BAC), a state agency "charged with...expand[ing] broadband access, adoption, and utilization" in Illinois. Budzinski resigned as senior advisor to the governor in March, 2020. She worked with John Podesta to advise the National Climate Resource Center and was Executive Director for Clean Jobs Illinois.

In February 2021, Budzinski, recommended for the post by Podesta, was appointed chief of staff of the Office of Management and Budget (OMB). During her tenure as chief of staff, she helped set up the OMB's Made in America division. On July 16, 2021, Budzinski resigned to return to Illinois, saying she "felt it was a good time to come back [to Illinois]...after getting things off the ground here."

U.S. House of Representatives

Elections

2022 

On August 24, 2021, Budzinski announced her bid for the Democratic nomination for Illinois's 13th congressional district, newly redrawn to favor Democrats. She won the primary in June 2022 against David Palmer and the general election in November against the Republican nominee, Regan Deering.

Committee assignments 
• House Committee on Agriculture

• House Committee on Veterans Affairs

References

External links 

Congresswoman Nikki Budzinski official U.S. House website
 Nikki Budzinski for Congress campaign website
  

|-

1977 births
21st-century American politicians
Democratic Party members of the United States House of Representatives from Illinois
Executive Office of the President of the United States
Female members of the United States House of Representatives
Illinois Democrats
Living people
Politicians from Peoria, Illinois
University of Illinois alumni
Women in Illinois politics